Manga Plus (stylized as MANGA Plus) is an online manga platform and smartphone app owned by Shueisha that was launched on January 28, 2019. It is available worldwide except in Japan, China, and South Korea which already have their own services, including Shōnen Jump+, the original Japanese service. Manga Plus publishes translated versions of new chapters from currently serialized manga in Weekly Shōnen Jump, a big portion of manga from the Shōnen Jump+ app/website, and some manga from Jump Square, Weekly Young Jump, Tonari no Young Jump and V Jump. The first three chapters and the three most recent chapters of all titles on the platform are available for free, while all titles from Shonen Jump+ have all of their chapters for free, except in the United States where some are also limited to first and last three chapters, due to the license of some manga. A Spanish version of the service launched in February 2019, and was followed by several other languages in the next two years.

History
Weekly Shōnen Jump reached a peak weekly circulation of 6.53 million copies in the 1990s, but the decline of print media has since been reducing readership. In response, publisher Shueisha turned towards digital distribution to attempt to reach out to a wider audience. In 2012, they launched the online Jump Book Store. In 2014, Shueisha launched Shōnen Jump+, an online platform that allows users to buy e-book versions of Jump manga and a digital version of Weekly Shōnen Jump. It also has large samples that can be read for free.

Shuhei Hosono, the head editor for Shōnen Jump+ and Manga Plus, said that they were aware of the many manga readers overseas, and that they wanted to bring manga to more people around the world. They began talks about a possible global version of Shōnen Jump+ in 2017. Shueisha finally launched Manga Plus on January 28, 2019. The service was made available to every country except China, South Korea, and Japan, with the latter countries being excluded because they each already have their own separate services. The Shōnen Jump+ editorial department manages overseas distribution through Manga Plus in-house. Yūta Momiyama, a Shueisha editor who manages the Shōnen Jump+ and Manga Plus online services, said this is with the intent of making the creation of hit manga on a global scale "a core part of Weekly Shōnen Jumps editorial approach".

Until Manga Plus, Shueisha's titles were distributed throughout the world via local publishers or distribution lines. The launch was the first time that Shueisha had expanded direct service globally. 50 manga titles were available at launch. A portion of the revenue earned from advertisements goes directly to the original manga authors.

At launch, English was the only language available on Manga Plus. The Spanish version launched on February 25, 2019, albeit with a different lineup of manga titles. The Thai version launched in December 2019, only available in Thailand, Cambodia and Laos. In February 2021, some titles became available in Indonesian. The Portuguese version of the site launched in April 2021, only available in Brazil and Portugal. In August 2021, Manga Plus took away the region restrictions for all languages, and made it possible to switch to other languages from the series page. The Russian version of the website and app launched on August 9, 2021, with the French version following in September 2021.

In October 2020, Manga Plus started its own official Discord server.

In February 2021, a redesigned web-app version of Manga Plus launched to commemorate its second anniversary.

At the end of June 2022, it was announced that starting in 2023, every new manga series launched on Shōnen Jump+ would receive a simultaneous English release on Manga Plus.

In August 2022, Shueisha launched Manga Plus Creators, a website and app that publishes user-submitted manga from users inside and outside of Japan; the Shōnen Jump+ editorial department is running the service along with localization company MediBang.

Format

Currently, the MangaPlus app has five sections:

Updates: Shows all chapters released on the app in the past seven days. This includes titles from Jump+ as well as Re-Editions, which are completed Shueisha titles that are released on a week-by-week basis for readers alongside new content. 
Featured: Includes features for new Jump manga, comments from Weekly Shonen Jump authors, and the most recently updated series separated by the magazine of publication. 
Browse: Compiles all manga posted on MangaPlus, as well as a tab showing the "Hottest" series based on number of views. Of note is that due to its nature as a promotional app, certain series will only have their first and last three chapters freely available to read - this usually applies to any manga licensed by a party outside of Shueisha, including Viz Media, Yen Press, and Udon Entertainment, as the idea is to support the official release when available. This also applies to oneshots or completed series - if they are licensed elsewhere, several weeks after release oneshots will be removed and completed series will only include the first three chapters. 
Creators: The homepage for Manga Plus Creators. Users can read and comment on user-submitted manga - the top ten most read series are reviewed by Shueisha and Medibang, and every month they reward series they deem exceptional with a cash prize, as well as potential publication on MangaPlus proper. 
My Shelf: Compiles series that the user has favorited, as well as options to change their username or avatar for comments, change manga languages, and other news and notices.

Titles
Series with a Re-Edition are marked with an asterisk (*).

Current Weekly Shōnen Jump series
Akane-banashi
Black Clover
Blue Box
Burn the Witch (on hiatus)
Cipher Academy
The Elusive Samurai
Fabricant 100
Ginka and Glüna
High School Family: Kokosei Kazoku
Hunter × Hunter (on hiatus)
Ichigoki's Under Control!!
The Ichinose Family's Deadly Sins
Jujutsu Kaisen
Mashle: Magic and Muscles
Me & Roboco
Mission: Yozakura Family
My Hero Academia
One Piece*
PPPPPP
Ruri Dragon (on hiatus)
Sakamoto Days
Tokyo Demon Bride Story
Undead Unluck
Witch Watch

Finished series
Act-Age (now removed)
Agravity Boys
Aliens Area
Assassination Classroom*
Ayashimon
Bakuman*
Beast Children
Bleach*
Bone Collection
Build King
Candy Flurry
Captain Tsubasa* (Spanish only)
Chainsaw Man (1st part)
DC3 (one-shot)
Death Note*
Demon Slayer
Doron Dororon
Double Taisei
Dr. Stone
Dr. Stone Reboot: Byakuya
Dragon Ball*
Earthchild
Food Wars!: Shokugeki no Soma
Guardian of the Witch
Haikyu!!*
Hard-Boiled Cop and Dolphin
Hell Warden Higuma
Hinomaru Sumo
The Hunters Guild: Red Hood
I Tell C
JoJo's Bizarre Adventure: Part 1–Phantom Blood*
JoJo's Bizarre Adventure: Part 2–Battle Tendency*
JoJo's Bizarre Adventure: Part 3–Stardust Crusaders*
Kuroko's Basketball*
The Last Saiyuki
Magu-chan: God of Destruction
Mitama Security: Spirit Busters
Moriking
Naruto*
Neolation
Neru: Way of the Martial Artist
Nine Dragons' Ball Parade
Nisekoi: False Love*
Our Blood Oath
Phantom Seer
The Promised Neverland
Protect Me, Shugomaru!
Reborn!* (Spanish only)
Rurouni Kenshin*
Samurai 8: The Tale of Hachimaru
Science vs. Magic (one-shot)
Shokugeki no Sanji
Super Smartphone
Teenage Renaissance! David
Time Paradox Ghostwriter 
Tokyo Shinobi Squad
We Never Learn
Yugen's All-Ghouls Homeroom
Yui Kamio Lets Loose
Zipman!!

Current Jump+ series
Ayakashi Triangle
Beat & Motion
Chainsaw Man (2nd part)
Dandadan
The Dark Doctor Ikuru
Diamond in the Rough
Even if You Slit My Mouth
The Game Devil
Ghost Reaper Girl (on hiatus)
Ghostbuster Osamu
Heart Gear
Hokkaido Gals Are Super Adorable!
Jiangshi X
Jinrui-Shoku: Blight of Man
Kiruru Kill Me (Spanish only - on hiatus)
Magilumiere Co. Ltd.
Make the Exorcist Fall in Love
Marriagetoxin
Me and My Gangster Neighbour
Moebana
Monster #8
Naruto: Konoha's Story — The Steam Ninja Scrolls
Naruto: Sasuke's Story — The Uchiha and The Heavenly Stardust
ONI: Road to be the Mightiest Oni Episode ZERO
Ron Kamonohashi: Deranged Detective
Skeleton Double
Spy × Family
Stage S (on hiatus)
Stan for Salvation
Tis Time for "Torture," PrincessTokyo UnderworldYou and I Are Polar OppositesYumeochi: Dreaming of Falling For YouFinished seriesAbyss RageArata Primal: The New PrimitiveAstra Lost in Space*Blue FlagCaptain Velvet Meteor: The Jump+ Dimensions ~The Beginning~ (one-shot)Curtain's up, I'm offDear Sa-chanDon't Blush, Sekime-san!Dricam!!East, Into The NightExcuse Me Dentist, It's Touching Me!Goodbye, Eri (one-shot)Hell's Paradise: JigokurakuHina ChangeJust Listen to the Song (one-shot)KoLD8: King of the Living DeadLand LockLook Back (one-shot)Moon LandNano HazardRomantic KillerThe Sign of AbyssSoloist in a CageSpotless Love: This Love Cannot Be Any More Beautiful.Suitô-to (Spanish only)Summer Time RenderingSummer Time Rendering 2026: The Room that Dreams of MurderTakopi's Original SinThe Vertical WorldWa no kage (Spanish only)World's End Harem: Britannia LumiereJump Square seriesBlue ExorcistClaymore* (finished)Platinum End (finished)Rosario + Vampire* (finished)Rosario + Vampire II* (finished)Seraph of the EndShow-ha Shoten!Tegami Bachi* (finished)Twin Star ExorcistsWorld TriggerV Jump seriesBoruto: Naruto Next GenerationsDragon Ball SuperYu-Gi-Oh! Arc-V (finished)Weekly Young Jump seriesKubo Won't Let Me Be Invisible (finished)Oshi no KoTerra Formars (on hiatus)Tokyo Ghoul* (finished)Tokyo Ghoul:re* (finished)Tonari no Young Jump seriesChoujin XSaikyō Jump series'''I'm From Japan (finished)Ubisoft x Jump+ one-shotsassassin's creed: cindersHAPPY VAAS DAYInsidekuroneko yawa x UBISOFTWRENCH MAKE SOME NOISE!MangaPlus Creators award winnersGENDER X BORDERScrap CircusI SOLD MY BODY TO A GODRuthless RenderUNBLESSED''

See also 
 Shonen Jump digital vault

References

External links
 

Internet properties established in 2019
Manga hosting services
Shueisha